This is a list of seasons completed by the DePaul Blue Demons men's college basketball team.

Seasons

Notes

DePaul
 
DePaul Blue Demons men's basketball seasons